Leucadendron spissifolium subsp. fragrans, the fragrant spear-leaf conebush, is a flower-bearing shrub belonging to the genus Leucadendron. The plant is native to the Western Cape and occurs in the Langeberg and Outeniqua Mountains from Gysmanshoek to the Woodville Forest Reserve, as well as the Swartberg and Kammanassie Mountains. It forms part of the fynbos.

The subspecies grows up to 1.3 meters tall and flowers from September to October. The seeds are stored in a toll on the female plant and first fall to the ground after a fire and are spread by the wind, the seeds have wings. The plant is unisexual and there are separate plants with male and female flowers, which are pollinated by insects. The plant grows mainly in sandstone soil on the crests and southern slopes at altitudes of 500 - 1800 m. The subspecies can be distinguished from others by its hairless leaves and conical bracts.

Gallery

References 

spissifolium subsp. fragrans